The John R. Wooden Coach of the Year, commonly known as the Pac-12 Coach of the Year, is an annual college basketball award presented to the top men's basketball coach in the Pac-12 Conference. The winner is selected by conference coaches, who are not allowed to vote for themselves. Former Arizona coach Lute Olson won the award a record seven times. It was first awarded in 1976, when the conference consisted of eight teams and was known as the Pacific-8, before becoming the Pacific-10 after expanding in 1978. Two more teams were added in 2011, when the conference became the Pac-12. The award was known as the Pac-10 Coach of the Year Award when it was renamed in John Wooden's honor following his death in June 2010. Wooden coached the UCLA Bruins for 27 years while winning a record 10 national championships, including seven straight. He retired in 1975, the year before the award began.

Dick DiBiaso of Stanford and George Raveling of Washington State were co-winners in the award's inaugural year. Both schools finished in the lower half of the conference that year. DiBiaso is the only coach to have received the award with a losing record. He was a first-year coach for the Cardinal (then nicknamed Cardinals) with only one returning starter, and the team lost a number of significant players to injury. Stanford's record was 9–18 with 11 losses by six points or less. Since the conference expanded to 10 teams in 1978, the winner of the award has typically qualified for the NCAA Tournament. Marv Harshman was 19–10 with Washington in 1981–82 and fellow Huskies coach Bob Bender finished 16–12 in 1995–96 when the schools landed in the National Invitation Tournament (NIT). In 1990–91, Kelvin Sampson guided Washington State to a 16–12 record and did not compete in a postseason tournament.

Winners

Winners by school

References

Awards established in 1976
NCAA Division I men's basketball conference coaches of the year
Coach of the Year